The 2022 Big East Conference men's soccer season was the tenth season for the newly realigned Big East Conference. Including the history of the original Big East Conference, this was the 27th season of men's soccer under the "Big East Conference" name.

Previous season

Coaching changes 
There were two head coaching change ahead of the 2022 season. Longtime UConn head coach, Ray Reid retired after coaching the program for 24 years. Former Northeastern head coach, Chris Gbandi, was hired to replace the outgoing Reid. After 12 seasons, Xavier head coach, Andy Fleming agreed to mutually terminate his contract with the university. Fleming was replaced by John Higgins, who had previously coached at the University of Indianapolis.

Coaches
Note: All stats current through the completion of the 2021 season

Preseason

Recruiting classes

Preseason Coaches polls
The preseason polls was released on August 17, 2022. Providence was picked to win the Big East.

Preseason awards

Hermann Trophy Watchlist

The Hermann Trophy Watchlist will be announced on August 25, 2022.

Preseason All Big East

Preseason Players of the Year

Rankings

National rankings

Regional rankings - USC Midwest Region 

The United Soccer Coaches' Midwest region ranks teams across the Big East , Horizon, and Missouri Valley Conferences.

Awards and honors

Player of the week honors
Following each week's games, Big East conference officials select the player of the week.

Postseason honors

See also 
 2022 Big East Conference women's soccer season

References

External links 
 Big Ten Men's Soccer

 
2022 NCAA Division I men's soccer season
2022